The Southwest community consists of the following neighborhoods: Linden Hills, East Harriet, Kingfield, Fulton, Lynnhurst, Tangletown, Armatage, Kenny, and Windom.  This portion of Minneapolis contains many parks and trails along Lake Harriet and Minnehaha Creek.

References

External links
 Southwest Business Association (SWBA)
 Experience Southwest : Southwest Minneapolis Business Directory (NEHBA sponsored)
 Businesses in Southwest Minneapolis

Communities in Minneapolis